The Clean Ocean Foundation is an Australian environmental organisation that seeks to stop all forms of ocean pollution and restore our oceans to their former health.

Clean Ocean Foundation holds that the best way of minimising the impact of the waste from any land-based activity is for the waste to be retained on land wherever possible so its impact can be properly monitored and minimised. It is dedicated to closure wherever possible of all ocean|sanitary sewer|sewerage|industrial outfalls.

If this is impossible Clean Ocean Foundation demands that rigorous, ongoing, transparent monitoring in conjunction in line with community standards and world's best practice occur at each outfall.

Clean Ocean Foundation is currently involved in research under the auspices of the Marine Biodiversity Hub to produce the National Outfall Database. The database identifies the location and composition of domestic outfalls on the Australian coastline. Clean Ocean Foundation is also developing community capability to monitor the impact of these outfalls on recreational users and the marine environment.

Clean Ocean Foundation was formed in 2000 by families, fisherman, and surfers who became concerned at the high level of pollution at Mornington Peninsula surf beaches such as Gunnamatta. The Foundation was successful in convincing the Victorian State Government to commit over 400 million dollars to upgrade Eastern Treatment Plant that discharges to Boags Rock Outfall near Gunnamatta beach.

Following this major victory, the Foundation is working towards the recycling of all wastewater from 254 outfalls around Australia to minimise the environmental effects of wastewater on the marine environment whilst also ensuring a vital source of water on a dry continent is not wasted.

The Foundation has also been successful in lobbying the NHMRC for Australia's recreational water guidelines to be raised to match World Health Organisation criteria.

Clean Ocean's mission is: "To protect our ocean ecosystem and establish sustainable water management practices."

See also
 Blue Wedges

References

Environmental organisations based in Australia
2000 establishments in Australia

External links